Machaj is a surname. Notable people with the surname include:

 Bartosz Machaj (born 1993), Polish footballer
 Mateusz Machaj (born 1989), Polish footballer
 Stefan Machaj (born 1964), Polish footballer

See also
 

Polish-language surnames